The 19th National Congress of the Kuomintang was the nineteenth national congress of the Kuomintang (KMT), which held on 10 November 2013 in Taichung Harbor Sports Stadium, Wuqi, Taichung, Taiwan.

History
The 19th national congress was originally planned to be held on 29 September 2013 at National Sun Yat-sen Memorial Hall in Taipei, but later changed to Taichung due to security concern.

Results
This congress marked the official inauguration of Ma Ying-jeou second term as Chairman of KMT in which he had won previously with 91.85% result during the KMT chairmanship election on 20 July 2013. Lien Chan and Wu Po-hsiung were reelected as KMT honorary chairmen. The current six vice chairpersons of KMT were also remain in their post.

See also
 Kuomintang

References

2013 conferences
2013 in Taiwan
National Congresses of the Kuomintang
Politics of Taiwan